

Events
18 January – Australian police drama series Blue Heelers premieres on Seven Network.
28 January – American animated series Rugrats makes its debut on ABC at 5:30 pm.
31 January – American children's action TV series Mighty Morphin' Power Rangers debuts on Seven Network.
31 January – A sequel to the Australian family film Clowning Around called Clowning Around II airs on Seven Network.
February – Derryn Hinch has taken over Ray Martin's place as host of the Australian award-winning daytime talk program Midday.
7 February – Nicky Buckley replaces Jo Bailey as Glenn Ridge's co-host on Sale Of The Century, where she would remain for the next 6 years.
10 February – American science fiction television series The X-Files makes it debut on Network Ten.
11 February – The ABC has inked a deal to sell its children's TV series Bananas in Pyjamas to various countries around the world. The series has been sold for broadcasting in the UK, Cyprus, Zimbabwe, New Zealand, Portugal, Iceland, Canada, Israel, Saudi Arabia, Belgium, the Netherlands, Sweden, Norway, Finland, Denmark, South Africa, Namibia and Ireland. A deal is about to be signed with a Japanese network to air the series and ABC Enterprises executives will fly over to the USA for the New York Toy Fair and talks on how to crack the lucrative US market.
27 February – Network Ten launches Heartbreak High, a brand new schoolroom drama which was a spinoff of the 1993 Australian romantic comedy feature film The Heartbreak Kid.
28 February – Australian long running children's TV series Mr Squiggle returns to ABC for a brand new series at 3:55 pm.
3 March – British long running science fiction series Doctor Who airs on ABC for the last time in its original run at 4:30 am with the fourth and final part of the sixth and final serial of Season 22 Revelation of the Daleks.
5 March – American animated series Animaniacs premieres on the Nine Network as part of their What's Up Doc? block.
21 March – Final episode of the Australian comedy series Mother and Son airs on ABC.
24 March – American sitcom Frasier starring Kelsey Grammer premieres on the Nine Network.
27 March – The Animals of Farthing Wood, a British children's animated series based on the books by Colin Dann premieres on ABC at 8:00 am as part of Couch Potato.
31 March – Australia's iconic and long running soap Home and Away begins premiering on NBC in Namibia.
10 April – Australian children's TV series Lift Off has spawned into a game show titled EC Plays Lift Off with Mr. Fish as the host and only running for 13 episodes. It will air on ABC on every Sunday morning as part of Couch Potato.
11 April – Australian children's comedy series The Ferals premieres on ABC.
11 April – Michael Tunn, the host of the ABC's Afternoon Show returns with a brand new music series called Loud as a replacement for the weekday afternoon magazine show that was axed in late 1993. The show includes music videos as well as reviews on movies and video games, feature stories on youth culture, musicians talking about their favourite music videos and on location interviews with bands and will be shown from Monday to Thursday at 5:30 pm.
13 April – A Country Practice switches over to air on Network Ten following its final air on Seven Network in 1993.
16 April – American children's TV series Barney & Friends premieres on Nine Network.
30 April – The Tasmanian television market is aggregated, with TasTV (now WIN Television) taking a Nine Network affiliation & Southern Cross taking a dual Seven and Ten affiliation.
9 May – Frontline a satirical look at current affairs television from Australian comedy group The D-Generation and starring Rob Sitch as anchor Mike Moore starts airing on the ABC.
16 May – A brand new Australian game show for children called A*mazing debuts on Seven Network. Hosted by James Sherry and airing at 4:30 pm, the show pitted teams from two different primary schools against each other during the course of a week. Points gained by each contestant during the week would be totalled up to decide the winning school at the end of each week.
20 May – SBS commences transmission in Darwin.
23 May – Australia's favourite koala Blinky Bill returns to television with a brand new animated series on ABC at 4:30 pm. The series had previously aired in Germany, Hong Kong, the UK, Singapore, Ireland and on UK forces television before airing in its homeland.
1 June - Australian soap opera Home and Away airs on television in the United States for the first time on the country's newly launched cable television channel FX. It would take years to bring the soap opera to America.
16 June – Final episode of the Australian music series Loud airs on ABC.
20 June – Australian teen game show Vidiot returns to the ABC for a brand new series with Scott McRae taking over as presenter.
30 June – ABC has expired the rights to the long running British science fiction series Doctor Who. The series itself will no longer continue to air on the Australian free for air public broadcaster until 2003, but will soon air on cable television on UKTV in 1996. The ABC will also broadcast the television movie of the series in July of the same year.
August – The Commonwealth Games are televised live on Network Ten from Victoria, British Columbia, Canada.
1 August – Melbourne's ATV10 celebrates 30 years of transmission.
17 August – Australian comedy series Hey Dad..! hosts its final original episode on Seven Network.
23 September – Iconic Australian drama series Banjo Paterson's The Man From Snowy River: The McGregor Saga starring Andrew Clarke and Wendy Hughes premieres on the Nine Network.
October – In Neighbours The Kennedy Family (Susan, Karl, Libby, Billy, Mal) arrive at No. 28, Doug & Pam Willis leave for Darwin, Julie Martin is killed in the Murder Mystery Weekend.
16 October – The Nine Network rebrands its on-air graphics.
19 October – A television special known as The Very Best of the Don Lane Show airs on Nine Network at 8:30 pm. It features Don Lane introducing some of the memorable segments to have come from the popular variety show that ran from 1975 to 1983, including footage of guest stars Mel Brooks, Billy Connolly, James Randi, Charlton Heston, Bob Hope, Liza Minnelli, Robin Williams, Sammy Davis Jr., Peter Allen, John Farnham, Peter Sellers and Johnny O'Keefe. This special was remastered for a DVD release in 2004.
5 November – A Country Practice (1981–1993 on Channel 7) revival attempt on Network Ten backfires and is swiftly cancelled due to low ratings.
26 November – The popular television character Ossie Ostrich leaves Hey Hey It's Saturday after 23 years as Daryl Somers' co-host. When the show returns in 1995, Somers will host solo.
The infamous TAC Nightshift commercial depicting A Volkswagen Kombi goes to air on television for the very first time.
The 1994 FIFA World Cup is broadcast live from the United States and is shown on SBS and Prime Television.
Community Television starts with long-term trials of stations in Melbourne, Sydney, Brisbane, Adelaide and Perth.
The ABC purchases an Australian children's television programme from the creators of Johnson and Friends called Boffins about tiny alien like creatures called Boffins who spent their days in kitchen cupboards and surrounding areas, trying to discover science behind how the world works. The series was never broadcast in Australia but it did air in several other countries such as Singapore, Israel, Malaysia, Brunei, Pakistan, Sri Lanka, Canada, Africa and the Middle East. The complete series will be released on VHS in Australia the following year by ABC Video and Roadshow Entertainment featuring all thirteen episodes.
American children's animated series Teenage Mutant Ninja Turtles changes it schedule to mornings as part of Agro's Cartoon Connection on Seven Network.

Debuts

International Programming

Changes to network affiliation
This is a list of programs which made their premiere on an Australian television network that had previously premiered on another Australian television network. The networks involved in the switch of allegiances are predominantly both free-to-air networks or both subscription television networks. Programs that have their free-to-air/subscription television premiere, after previously premiering on the opposite platform (free-to air to subscription/subscription to free-to air) are not included. In some cases, programs may still air on the original television network. This occurs predominantly with programs shared between subscription television networks.

Domestic

International

Specials

Television
ABC TV
 Mr. Squiggle and Friends (1959–1999)
 Four Corners (1961–present)
 Rage (1987–beyond)
 G.P. (1989–1996)
 Foreign Correspondent (1992–present)
 The Damnation of Harvey McHugh (1994)

Seven Network
 Wheel of Fortune (1981–1996, 1996–2003, 2004-beyond)
 A Country Practice (1981–1994)
 Home and Away (1988–present)
 Family Feud (1988–1996)
 Real Life (1992–1994)
 The Great Outdoors (1993–2006, 2007)
 Full Frontal (1993–present)

Nine Network
 Sunday (1981–2008)
 Today (1982 – present)
 Sale of the Century (1980–2001)
 A Current Affair (1971–1978, 1988–2005, 2006–present)
 Hey Hey It's Saturday (1971–1999)
 The Midday Show (1973–1998)
 60 Minutes (1979–present)
 The Flying Doctors (1986–1991)
 Australia's Funniest Home Video Show (1990–2000, 2000–2004, 2005–present)
 Hey Hey It's Saturday (1971–1999)
 Getaway (1992–present)
 Our House (1993–2001)
 Money (1993–2000)

Network Ten
 Neighbours (1985 – present)
 E Street (1989–1993)
 Good Morning Australia with Bert Newton (1991–2005)
 Sports Tonight (1993–2011)

Ending this year

See also
 1994 in Australia
 List of Australian films of 1994

References